Ansignan is a commune in the Pyrénées-Orientales département in southern France.

Geography

Localisation 
Ansignan is located in the canton of La Vallée de l'Agly and in the arrondissement of Perpignan.

Government and politics

Communal administration 
The town council of Ansignan is composed in 2014 of eleven councilors : seven men (the mayor, two deputy mayors and four councilors) and four women (four councilors).

Mayors

Population

See also
Communes of the Pyrénées-Orientales department

References

Communes of Pyrénées-Orientales
Fenouillèdes